The Ecologist Group, officially the Ecologist Group - NUPES since 2022, is a French parliamentary group in the National Assembly. The first iteration of the group was existed between June 2012 and May 2016 during the 14th legislature of the French Fifth Republic. After disbanding following the 2017 French legislative election, the group was recreated in June 2022, at the start of the 16th legislature of the French Fifth Republic, following the 2022 French legislative election.

List of presidents

Historical membership 

National Assembly (France)
Parliamentary groups in France